The men's normal hill K95 individual competition at the 2011 Asian Winter Games in Almaty, Kazakhstan was held on 4 February at the International Ski Jump Complex.

Schedule
All times are Almaty Time (UTC+06:00)

Results

References

Normal Hill Individual Results

External links
 Official website

Normal